Jason G. Misolas is a Filipino former professional basketball player in the Philippine Basketball Association (PBA). He is currently an assistant coach for the UST Growling Tigers.

References 

1978 births
Living people
Barako Bull Energy Boosters players
Basketball players from Albay
Filipino men's basketball players
Letran Knights basketball players
Powerade Tigers players
Power forwards (basketball)
Sta. Lucia Realtors players
Filipino men's basketball coaches
Powerade Tigers draft picks
UST Growling Tigers basketball coaches